Korchi (also Romanized as Korchī; also known as Korjī) is a village in Lavij Rural District, Chamestan District, Nur County, Mazandaran Province, Iran. At the 2006 census, its population was 317, in 68 families.

References 

Populated places in Nur County